Calleras (Caeras) is one of 44 parishes (administrative divisions) in Tineo, a municipality within the province and autonomous community of Asturias, in northern Spain.

The village of Calleras has a church of noteworthy architecture, built late in the 19th century, with enormous dimensions to accommodate its Baroque altar from a disappeared monastery in Belmonte de Miranda.

Villages and hamlets
 Busmeon
 Bustellin
 Calleras
 Ese de Calleras
 La Corredoira
 Llaneces
 El Montelloso
 Pena
 La Pila
 La Rebollada
 Relloso
 Veneiro

References

Parishes in Tineo